Higher Education is a 1996 science fiction novel by Charles Sheffield and Jerry Pournelle. It first appeared in the February to May 1986 issues of Analog Science Fiction and Fact The book is part of the Jupiter series and was first published in book form by Tor Books in June 1986.

Plot introduction
The novel starts in a future dystopian earth where the United States has become a woefully inefficient bureaucratized nation. The public school system is primarily interested in promoting self-esteem rather than learning. For example, the vast majority of public high school graduates are illiterate, and end up in "the pool"; an endless crowd of unemployable youths depending on government assistance or crime for survival. The book is told from the perspective of the main character, a high school student named Rick who quickly finds himself expelled after a practical joke goes wrong.

Plot summary
Since expulsion means that Rick's family will no longer be able to claim their welfare bonus, Rick begins looking for a job.  One of his former teachers encourages him to get a job for the Vanguard Mining corporation, whose primary financial interest is in space mining of asteroids in the asteroid belt. The book follows his progress through an initial grueling examination period on Earth, initial training on an asteroid in a high orbit of Earth, and through an apprenticeship on another training facility in the asteroid belt.  After proving himself, Rick is recruited to
join a secret program to infiltrate and subvert Earth's education systems away from its current initiative-deadening pandering to the lowest common denominator.

Characters
 "Rick" is the primary protagonist of the novel.  He is a high-school student who is forced to take a job mining asteroids after being expelled from school.
 "Turkey Gossage" is Rick's instructor on the asteroid in Earth orbit. He is tough, unforgiving and unyielding.

Reception
Critical reception was mostly positive, with Booklist listing Higher Education on its Editor's Choice list for 1996 and named it a "Top 10 fantasy novels for young readers." Kirkus Reviews gave Higher Education a mixed review, writing that fans of the authors' previous works would enjoy the novel but expressing frustration that the female characters were "either girlfriend material (Deedee Mao), corporate saboteurs (Alice Klein), or space sluts (Monkey Cruse, "rumored to have run a professional sex service"). Those stereotypical characterizations, the melodramatic plot, and the dialogue turn the adventure into a space soap opera.".

References

1996 American novels
Novels by Charles Sheffield
Novels by Jerry Pournelle
Jupiter novels
American science fiction novels
Fiction about main-belt asteroids
1996 science fiction novels
Tor Books books
Fiction about asteroid mining
Collaborative novels
Novels first published in serial form
Works originally published in Analog Science Fiction and Fact